Mieczysław Pawełkiewicz (February 13, 1938, Bielsko-Biała – December 3, 2007, Bielsko-Biała) was a Polish luger who competed during the mid-1960s. He won two silver medals at the FIL World Luge Championships, earning his first in men's doubles in 1963 and his second in men's singles in 1965.

Pawełkiewicz also competed in luge at the 1964 Winter Olympics in Innsbruck, finishing sixth in the men's singles and seventh in the men's doubles event, respectively.

References

Further references
 Hickok sports information on World champions in luge and skeleton.
 Wallechinsky, David. (1984). "Luge – Men's singles". The Complete Book of the Olympics: 1896–1980. New York: Penguin Books. pp. 575–6.
 

1938 births
2007 deaths
Lugers at the 1964 Winter Olympics
Polish male lugers
Olympic lugers of Poland
Sportspeople from Bielsko-Biała